The 2000 UCI Track Cycling World Championships were the World Championship for track cycling. They took place in Manchester, United Kingdom from October 26 to October 30, 2000.

Medal table

Medal summary

Notes

References

External links
World Track Championships - Manchester, October 25-29, 2000 cyclingnews.com
Tissot Timing results (incomplete)

 
Uci Track Cycling World Championships, 2000
Track cycling
UCI Track Cycling World Championships by year
International cycle races hosted by England
October 2000 sports events in Europe